The RAD6000 radiation-hardened single-board computer, based on the IBM RISC Single Chip CPU, was manufactured by IBM Federal Systems. IBM Federal Systems was sold to Loral, and by way of acquisition, ended up with Lockheed Martin and is currently a part of BAE Systems Electronic Systems. RAD6000 is mainly known as the onboard computer of numerous NASA spacecraft.

History
The radiation-hardening of the original RSC 1.1 million-transistor processor to make the RAD6000's CPU was done by IBM Federal Systems Division working with the Air Force Research Laboratory.

, there are 200 RAD6000 processors in space on a variety of NASA, United States Department of Defense and commercial spacecraft, including:
 Mars Exploration Rovers (Spirit and Opportunity)
 Deep Space 1 probe
 Mars Polar Lander and Mars Climate Orbiter
 Mars Odyssey orbiter
 Spitzer Infrared Telescope Facility
 MESSENGER probe to Mercury
 STEREO Spacecraft
 IMAGE/Explorer 78 MIDEX spacecraft
 Genesis and Stardust sample return missions
 Phoenix Mars Polar Lander
 Dawn Mission to the asteroid belt using ion propulsion
 Solar Dynamics Observatory, Launched Feb 11, 2010 (flying both RAD6000 and RAD750)
 Burst Alert Telescope Image Processor on board the Swift Gamma-Ray Burst Mission 
 DSCOVR Deep Space Climate Observatory spacecraft

The computer has a maximum clock rate of 33 MHz and a processing speed of about 35 MIPS. In addition to the CPU itself, the RAD6000 has 128 MB of ECC RAM. A typical real-time operating system running on NASA's RAD6000 installations is VxWorks.  The Flight boards in the above systems have switchable clock rates of 2.5, 5, 10, or 20 MHz.

Reported to have a unit cost somewhere between US$200,000 and US$300,000, RAD6000 computers were released for sale in the general commercial market in 1996.

The RAD6000's successor is the RAD750 processor, based on IBM's PowerPC 750.

See also
 IBM RS/6000
 PowerPC 601, a consumer chip with similar computing capabilities to the RAD6000

References

External links
Software on Mars rovers 'space qualified' – By Matthew Fordahl/AP, 23 January 2004
AFRL Rad6000 fact sheet
Software Behind the Mars Phoenix Lander (Audio Interview)
 The CPUs of Spacecraft Computers in Space

Avionics computers
RAD6000
Radiation-hardened microprocessors
American inventions
Computer-related introductions in 1996